FDM Jyllands-Ringen is a motor racing circuit in Resenbro, near Silkeborg in Denmark.

Jyllands-Ringen hosted regular rounds of the Danish Touringcar Championship. From 2014 to 2019, it hosted multiple annual rounds of the Danish Thundersport Championship. Since 2020, it has hosted multiple annual rounds of the TCR Denmark Touring Car Series.

This was the home of the Danish Grand Prix in 1968, 1969 and 1970 the races were for Sports Prototypes and Sports GT cars. The 1968 and 1969 Danish Grand Prix were both won by Barrie Smith in a Chevron B8 Ford. A Ford twin cam engine car in 1968 and a Cosworth FVA engine car in 1969.

Lap records 

The official race lap records at the Jyllands-Ringen are listed as:

References

External links
 
 RacingCircuits.info

FIA Grade 4 circuit
Motorsport venues in Denmark